Harold Burnett (23 June 1915 – 18 December 1981) was a Trinidadian cricketer. He played in eleven first-class matches for Trinidad and Tobago from 1942 to 1947.

See also
 List of Trinidadian representative cricketers

References

External links
 

1915 births
1981 deaths
Trinidad and Tobago cricketers